The 2023 TBL season is the sixth season of The Basketball League (TBL). The league expanded from 44 teams in the 2022 season to over 50 in 2023.The National Basketball League of Canada once again will partner with The Basketball League in joint league expansion.

League changes
The Connecticut Cobras relocated to Charlotte, North Carolina and became the Charlotte Purple Jackets.

On April 11, 2022, the league announced the return of professional basketball to Seattle.

On June 18, 2022 the National Basketball League of Canada (NBLC) announced that TBL President David Magley, a former NBL Commissioner, will work alongside Audley Stephenson, the current National Basketball League of Canada (NBLC) Commissioner in overseeing the growth of both leagues.
 Three Canadian basketball teams joined the league: the Newfoundland Rogues, Montreal Tundra, and L'Academie D'Alma.

Standings

Northeast

Southeast

Central Conference

Central

Lower Midwest Conference

Upper Midwest Conference

West Conference

References

External links

The Basketball League seasons
2023 in basketball leagues